Akinlabi is a Yoruba given name and surname meaning "We have a boy". Notable people with this name include:

Given name

 Akinlabi Olasunkanmi, Nigerian businessman and politician
 Marvin Olawale Akinlabi Park, Spanish professional footballer 

Surname

 Godman Akinlabi, Nigerian pastor
 Peter Akinlabi, Nigerian table tennis player

References 

Yoruba-language surnames